Seediq Bale is the fourth studio album by Taiwanese black metal band Chthonic, released in 2005. The album was the band's first to receive full promotion and release outside of Asia, being released in November 2006 in the United States and worldwide in February 2007. It was positively reviewed by several websites and magazines,,  and boosted them into several popular magazines such as Terrorizer, as well as onto the lineups for both Ozzfest and Wacken Open Air.

The album featured session drummer Reno Kiilerich, formerly of Dimmu Borgir, and Sandee Chan, a Taiwanese singer, on female backing vocals. The English-language versions of the album fail to mention these members.

The English-language version includes three video tracks at the beginning of the disc: "Indigenous Laceration", "Quasi Putrefaction" and "Bloody Gaya Fulfilled".

Track listing
Taiwanese version

English version

Credits

Taiwanese version
Freddy Lim – vocals, erhu
Jesse Liu – guitar
Reno Kiilerich – drums
Doris Yeh – bass guitar
Roger (Su-Nung) – erhu
Alexia – keyboard
Sandee Chan – backing vocals
Jan Borsing – sound engineer

English version
Freddy, Left Face of Maradou – vocals
Jesse, the Infernal – guitar
Doris, Thunder Tears – bass guitar, backing vocals
Dani, Azathothian Hands – drums
Su-Nung, the Bloody String – erhu
CJ, Dispersed Fingers – keyboard
Jan Borsing – sound engineer

References

Chthonic (band) albums
2005 albums